Beaver Dams is a hamlet in Schuyler County, New York, United States. Beaver Dams has a post office with ZIP code 14812, which opened on August 12, 1833,  and a Methodist church on Route 19.

References

Hamlets in Schuyler County, New York
Hamlets in New York (state)